Route 344 is an east/west highway on the north shore of the Ottawa River in Quebec, Canada. Its western terminus is in Grenville-sur-la-Rouge at the junction of Autoroute 50, and its eastern terminus is in L'Assomption at the junction of Route 343. It follows the Ottawa River from Grenville-sur-la-Rouge to Saint-André-d'Argenteuil, where it follows the Lac des Deux Montagnes until Deux-Montagnes, where it follows the Rivière des Mille Îles until Repentigny, where it follows the Rivière l'Assomption until L'Assomption.

Municipalities along Route 344

 Grenville-sur-la-Rouge
 Grenville
 Brownsburg-Chatham
 Saint-André-d'Argenteuil
 Saint-Placide
 Kanesatake
 Oka
 Saint-Joseph-du-Lac
 Pointe-Calumet
 Sainte-Marthe-sur-le-Lac
 Deux-Montagnes
 Saint-Eustache
 Boisbriand
 Rosemère
 Lorraine
 Bois-des-Filion
 Terrebonne
 Charlemagne
 Repentigny (Le Gardeur)
 L'Assomption

See also
 List of Quebec provincial highways

References

External links 

 Provincial Route Map (Courtesy of the Quebec Ministry of Transportation) 
 Route 344 on Google Maps

344
Transport in Repentigny, Quebec
Transport in Terrebonne, Quebec